Popeye the Sailor is an American animated television series produced for King Features Syndicate TV starring Popeye that was released between 1960 and 1963 with 220 episodes produced. The episodes were produced by a variety of production studios and aired in broadcast syndication until the 1990s.

Production 
In the late 1950s, the original Popeye the Sailor theatrical shorts released by Paramount Pictures from 1933 to 1957 began airing in many television markets and garnered huge ratings. King Features Syndicate, which owned the rights to the "Popeye" character, did not earn any money from the syndication of the theatrical shorts. In order to capitalize on Popeye's television popularity, King Features hastily commissioned a new series of made-for-TV Popeye animated shorts. Al Brodax served as executive producer of the cartoons for King Features' then-newly created television production and distribution division (known today as Hearst Entertainment, named after King Features' parent company, Hearst Communications). Jack Mercer, Mae Questel and Jackson Beck returned for this series, which was produced by several different animation companies, including Larry Harmon Pictures, Rembrandt Films, Halas and Batchelor, Gerald Ray Studios, Jack Kinney Productions, and Italy-based animation company Corona Cinematografica. Famous Studios, which produced the theatrical entries from 1942 to 1957, also returned, although by this point it had been renamed Paramount Cartoon Studios.

The series was produced using limited animation techniques, whose production values contrasted sharply to the theatrical shorts. The artwork was streamlined, simplified for television budgets, and the entries were completed at a breakneck pace; 220 made-for-television cartoons were produced in two years. In contrast, 231 theatrical cartoons were produced over 24 years. Several minor changes were made for the characters. Though World War II had ended 15 years earlier, Popeye still retained his white US Navy uniform as had been the case for post-war theatrical shorts. Olive Oyl's appearance was a hybrid of different incarnations; while her outfit reverted to the Fleischer years of a red turtleneck, long black skirt and huge shoes, her hair retained the mid/late 1940s and 1950s makeover initiated by Famous Studios. Notably, the short "Barbecue for Two" uses the designs from the earlier theatrical shorts.

The biggest change was to Bluto, whose name was changed to "Brutus". At the time, King Features believed that Paramount owned the rights to the name "Bluto", but the character had been originally created for the comic strip. However, due to a lack of thorough research, they failed to realize this and reinvented him as Brutus to avoid supposed copyright infringement problems. Realizing their mistake, King Features began to promote Brutus as an entirely new character. His demeanor was altered slightly, and his physical appearance was changed from being muscular to slightly obese. In addition, his sailor uniform was replaced with an enormous blue shirt and brown pants. Many entries lifted storylines directly from the comic strip, resulting in the inclusion of many characters not seen in the theatrical releases, including the Sea Hag, Toar, Rough House, and King Blozo. Like their theatrical counterparts, the made-for-television series was also a big ratings success. Popeye the Sailor aired in syndication in the United States into the 1990s. Notably, the 1960s shorts marked the final time that Mae Questel would voice Olive Oyl.

Voice cast 
 Jack Mercer - Popeye, Wimpy, Poopdeck Pappy, King Blozo, Additional voices
 Mae Questel - Olive, Swee'Pea, Sea Hag, Alice the Goon, Diesel Oyl
 Jackson Beck - Brutus, Toar, O. G. Wotasnozzle, Rough House, Additional voices

List of episodes

Larry Harmon Pictures 
Note: The stories of all episodes are written by Charlie Shows.

 1. "Muskels Shmuskels" - September 1, 1960 - Popeye runs afoul of circus heavyweight Brutus.
 2. "Hoppy Jalopy" - September 2, 1960 - Popeye races to save Olive from Brutus, who places death traps around the track.
 3. "Dead-Eye Popeye" - September 2, 1960
 4. "Mueller's Mad Monster" - September 2, 1960 - Popeye and Olive tangle with a mad scientist's monster.
 5. "Caveman Capers" - September 3, 1960 - Popeye remembers his prehistoric ancestor's discovery of spinach.
 6. "Bullfighter Bully" - September 3, 1960
 7. "Ace of Space" - September 3, 1960
 8. "College of Hard Knocks" - September 4, 1960
 9. "Abdominal Snowman" - September 4, 1960
 10. "Ski-Jump Chump" - September 4, 1960
 11. "Irate Pirate" - September 5, 1960
 12. "Foola-Foola Bird" - September 5, 1960
 13. "Uranium on the Cranium" - September 5, 1960 - Popeye and Brutus race to an island containing uranium.
 14. "Two-Faced Paleface"  - September 8, 1960
 15. "Childhood Daze" - September 8, 1960 - Popeye has to protect Olive from Brutus, while he is changed into a baby.
 16. "Sheepish Sheep-Herder" - September 8, 1960 - Popeye and Poopdeck Pappy clash with rustlers.
 17. "Track Meet Cheat" - September 9, 1960
 18. "Crystal Ball Brawl" - September 9, 1960 - Brutus tries to steal a crystal ball in Popeye's possession.

Rembrandt Films/Halas and Batchelor 
 1. "Interrupted Lullaby" - September 9, 1960 - Brutus learns from a newspaper headline that Swee'Pea has inherited 1 million dollars. Brutus devises a plot to kidnap the baby, but must get past Popeye, who has been left to babysit while Olive shops.
 2. "Sea No Evil" - September 10, 1960 - Brutus is a marine shopkeeper who is practicing quite a scam. (Note: Jack Mercer performs Brutus here.)
 3. "From Way Out" - September 10, 1960 - Popeye, Olive, and the Professor deal with a Martian delinquent.
 4. "Seeing Double" - September 10, 1960 - Two plot elements: an expensive mink stole and a mechanical doppelganger of Popeye.
 5. "Swee'pea Soup" - September 11, 1960 - King Blozo's subjects demand that he step down and install Swee'pea as King.
 6. "Hag-Way Robbery" - September 11, 1960 - Sea Hag steals much spinach.
 7. "The Lost City of Bubble-lon" - September 11, 1960 - Brutus raids an undersea kingdom.
 8. "There's No Space Like Home" - September 12, 1960 - Brutus exploits a costume party in an attempt to win Olive.
 9. "Potent Lotion" - September 12, 1960 - Popeye receives an "aftershave lotion" that induces aggression in anyone who smells him while Brutus and his cronies rob the bank.
 10. "Astro-Nut" - September 12, 1960 - Popeye volunteers to be the test subject for the space capsule and must remain inside for the next 60 days.
 11. "Goon with the Wind" - September 18, 1960 - Popeye and Olive enjoy a quiet stroll on the boat, arriving in Goon Island with the whole group of Goons.
 12. "Insultin' the Sultan" - September 18, 1960 - Popeye and Olive get into a heated argument and break up. However, when a sultan wants Olive to be his bride, Popeye decides to go back to his old lover.
 13. "Dog-Gone Dog-Catcher" - September 19, 1960 - When Olive's poodle named Zsa-Zsa gets snatched by Brutus, the unruly dog catcher, Popeye is determined to rescue Zsa-Zsa by disguising himself in a dog outfit. 
 14. "Voice from the Deep! or See Here Sea Hag!!" - September 19, 1960 - Popeye is called to Phony Island to help Chief Knucklebone and investigate the "talking volcano". He soon learns that Sea Hag is behind the strange voice.
 15. "Matinée Idol Popeye" - September 19, 1960 - Director Brutus constantly finds roles for Popeye so deadly that they could kill him. (Note: the copyright line on the title card is incorrect as MCMXL (1940) instead of MCMLX (1960).)
 16. "Beaver or Not" - September 22, 1960 -  Two beavers build a dam that floods property owned by Popeye.
 17. "The Billionaire"  - September 17, 1961 - Take-off on the television series The Millionaire.
 18. "Model Muddle" - September 18, 1961 - Olive decides that Popeye needs some type of art stuff, so she takes him to the American Museum of Art.
 19. "Which Is Witch" - September 18, 1961 - The Sea Hag has a late plan. She makes a robot double of Olive to attack Popeye.
 20. "Disguise the Limit" - September 18, 1961 - The master of disguises, Popeye and Brutus; Today's case is "The Gorilla Escapes from Zoo". It is a disguising case to solve.
 21. "Spoil Sport" - September 19, 1961 - Olive wants to live the "sports car set" life and is baited by Brutus' expensive convertible.
 22. "Have Time, Will Travel" - September 19, 1961 - A time machine takes Popeye and Olive back to the prehistoric era, where all kinds of madcap adventures take place.
 23. "Intellectual Interlude" - May 19, 1962 - Olive Oyl tells Popeye that he needs to be more intellectual, so she enrolls herself and Popeye into adult education classes. While there, he samples a scientist's "Intellectual Spinach" potion which gives him genius-level intelligence. 
 24. "Partial Post" - January 22, 1962 - A spaceship lands on Earth carrying an alien disguised as a mailbox, just when Popeye wants to post a card to Olive.
 25. "Weight for Me" - September 22, 1961 - Depressed over a lengthy tour by Popeye and Brutus, Olive eats herself into a grotesque shape.
 26. "Canine Caprice" - March 22, 1962 - A talking dog (Jackson Beck) gets Popeye in repeated bits of trouble.
 27. "Roger" - February 2, 1963 - Roger the talking dog wins himself back into Popeye and Olive's good graces in time to thwart a jewelry store heist.
 28. "Tooth Be or Not Tooth Be" - April 23, 1963 - Swee'Pea undergoes an early rite of passage - his first tooth. Poopdeck Pappy tells Swee'Pea the story about how the Sea Hag tried to steal his perfect set of teeth.

Gerald Ray Studios 
Note: In this production, the animation team was composed by: Izzy Ellis, Sam Kai, Casey Onaitis, Ray Young, Bill Higgins, Barney Posner, John Garling, and Bud Partch. Finally, backgrounds and layouts are made respectively by Dave Weidman and Henry Lee.

Jack Kinney Productions

Paramount Cartoon Studios

Home video

VHS 
In the late 1990s, the Popeyes Chicken & Biscuits restaurant franchise released most of the 1960s cartoons on VHS in the Popeye Cartoon Video Collection Series promotional line. Each video in the series featured one promotional segment for Popeyes showing video footage of its fried chicken, biscuits and other products followed by the 1960s Popeye cartoons. After the cartoons, the second segment for Popeyes and two bonus cartoons were also featured.

DVD 
In 2004, Family Home Entertainment released four of the 1960s cartoons on the DVD release of Popeye's Voyage: The Quest for Pappy. The shorts included "Spinach Greetings" (a classic Christmas episode), "Popeye in the Grand Steeple Chase", "Valley of the Goons", and "William Won't Tell". 85 of the 1960s Popeye cartoons were released on DVD by Koch Vision in a three-disc DVD set entitled Popeye's 75th Anniversary.

As part of the licensing to release DVD collections of the original theatrical Popeye cartoons that had originally been released by Paramount, Warner Bros., which had come to own the shorts, also released a collection of the TV cartoons. The collection was released on May 7, 2013, and included 72 cartoons. Most of the cartoons to be released were produced by Paramount Cartoon Studios. As of 2019, no further volumes have been released.

A total of 126 shorts from the series have been released across various DVD releases, accounting for cartoons released multiple times.

Streaming
A version which includes all 220 shorts, presented in 55 half-hour cartoons, can be seen on Amazon Prime Video as Classic Popeye.

References

External links 
 Hearst Entertainment's official page for the series (Identified as both "Original Popeye" and "Classic Popeye")
 

1960s American animated television series
1960 American television series debuts
1963 American television series endings
American children's animated comedy television series
English-language television shows
First-run syndicated television programs in the United States
Genies in television
Popeye the Sailor (King Features Syndicate)
Television series by Famous Studios
Television series by Format Films
Television series by Warner Bros. Television Studios
Rembrandt Films
Television series by Halas and Batchelor